Akaradej Wongpitakroj (born September 19, 1976), or usually known by his nickname "Mung" (มุ่ง), is a Thai Democrat Party politician who represented Ratchaburi province in the 25th House of Representatives.

Biography and political career
Akaradej was born in Ban Pong district, northernmost Ratchaburi province to a Thai-Chinese father, Vutipong Wongpitakroj, whose is a local businessman who owns a major construction material trading business.

He graduated with a bachelor's degree from Faculty of Science, Chulalongkorn University and received a master's degree in business administration from Khon Kaen University.

Before becoming a politician, he had run a family business.

Akaradej was a MP for Ratcahburi province (constituency four: entire of Ban Pong) in the general election on March 24, 2019 by defeating the former MP Chaworalut Chinthammamitr of the Palang Pracharath Party, with 37,423 votes for Akaradej, and 32,677 votes for Chaworalut. He is also considered the only Democrat candidate in this election to be a MP in the areas that were not belonged to Democrats before, due to the declining popularity of the party.

After election, he was appointed deputy spokesman for the Democrat Party.

References

External links
 

Living people
1976 births
Akaradej Wongpitakroj
Akaradej Wongpitakroj
Akaradej Wongpitakroj
Akaradej Wongpitakroj
Akaradej Wongpitakroj
Akaradej Wongpitakroj
Akaradej Wongpitakroj